Tropical Storm Frances caused extensive flooding in Mexico and Texas in September 1998. The sixth tropical cyclone and sixth named storm of the annual hurricane season, Frances developed from a low pressure area in the Gulf of Mexico on September 8. The cyclone moved northward through the western Gulf of Mexico, making landfall across the central Texas coastline before recurving across the Midwest through southeast Canada and New England.  A large tropical cyclone for the Atlantic basin, yet an average sized system by western Pacific standards, the storm produced heavy rains across the Isthmus of Tehuantepec, Texas, western Louisiana and the Great Plains.

The interaction between developing Frances and Pacific Tropical Storm Javier produced torrential rainfall in southeastern Mexico, causing flooding that killed over 200 people and caused $63 million in damage. Coastal flooding overran the coasts of Louisiana and Texas, which worsened river flooding across the region.  Federal disaster declarations were made for the states of Louisiana and Texas on September 23 for damage relating to this tropical cyclone.  Damage totaled US$500 million (1998 dollars), mainly from flooding.  There was one direct death and one indirect death associated with the tropical storm.  Frances was the second tropical cyclone to hit Texas during the 1998 season, with Charley being the other.

Meteorological history

Before the storm formed, sea surface temperatures were above normal in the Bay of Campeche and tropical eastern Pacific Ocean. After Hurricane Earl developed and moved away from the region, a broad area of low pressure formed in the southwest Caribbean on September 4. It moved to the northwest and slowly organized in the Gulf of Mexico, although a series of tropical waves prevented rapid development. By September 8, there was a large area of convection located over the western Gulf of Mexico. Initially, the depression was large, without a well-defined center of circulation. It more resembled a monsoon depression commonly seen in the Western Pacific Ocean and the Northern Indian Ocean. The depression drifted southward and strengthened into Tropical Storm Frances on September 9.

Shortly after landfall, the storm executed a small loop before turning to the north and dissipating as a tropical cyclone on September 13. The remnant low of Frances persisted another day, becoming a frontal wave over Iowa. This frontal wave moved across the Great Lakes and New England into the north Atlantic by the 16th.

Preparations
A tropical storm warning was issued for the Texas coast between High Island and Brownsville on the afternoon of the 8th.  The next afternoon, the warning area was extended southward into northeast Mexico to Tampico.  By the afternoon of the 10th, strong winds along the Louisiana coast led to an extension of the tropical storm warning eastward to the Pearl River.  On the 11th, as Frances moved inland, tropical storm warnings were slowly lifted.

Impact

Federal disaster declarations were made for the states of Louisiana and Texas on September 23 for damage relating to this tropical cyclone.  Although there was little wind damage, Frances caused $500 million (1998 USD) in damage, mostly from flooding. In addition, it killed one person. Several counties in Texas and Louisiana were declared disaster areas.

Mexico
Simultaneous to Frances's development, Tropical Storm Javier was located to the west of Mexico in the Pacific, although its moisture produced an area of thunderstorms that extended to the east toward southeastern Mexico. The interaction between the depression that became Frances and Javier produced three days of heavy rainfall along the Sierra Madre de Chiapas. On September 6, a station named Guadalupe Victoria recorded 15.79 in (401 mm) of rainfall. In the period from 1981 to 2010, this was the highest rainfall total in Chiapas related to a tropical cyclone.

About one-third of the population of Chiapas, or about 800,000 people, was directly affected by the flooding, most significantly in Motozintla and Pijijiapan. In Motozintla, near Mexico's border with Chiapas, a two-day rainfall total of 12 in (305 mm) produced flash floods and mudslides. The rainfall total represented about 36% of the town's average annual precipitation. About 600 homes were destroyed in the town alone, and there were 30 fatalities. The rains caused 36 river basins to exceed their banks. Following the floods, officials in Motozintla created a channel to divert flooding. Throughout Chiapas, the floods damaged or destroyed 40 bridges, and there was damage to Mexican Federal Highway 200 along the Pacific coast; this interrupted travel for several weeks. About 16,000 houses were damaged, forcing about 25,000 people in government shelters. The floods affected  of croplands. Overall, damage was estimated at $63 million (1998 USD), representing Mexico's worst natural disaster since the 1985 Mexico City earthquake. Along Sierra Madre de Chiapas, the disaster was considered a 1 in 50 year event. There were at least 229 deaths, although a government report on the flooding indicated there were over 1000 people killed or missing. After the storm, the Mexican government established a study to determine the cause and the impact of the flooding.

Louisiana
This rainfall helped relieve drought conditions. The storm surge swept away five houses, destroyed a fishing pier, and submerged Grand Isle. A tornado in the outer bands of the storm killed one person in Lafourche Parish, while six others were injured. At least eight tornadoes were witnessed statewide, with seven touching down across Acadiana. In addition, the storm caused an indirect death in the New Orleans area in an automobile accident. m Also, two Pacific Coast League Playoff games involving the 1998 Triple A baseball champion New Orleans Zephyrs were cancelled due to the rain from Francis, and a third almost got called off, but thanks to the assistance from Zephyr Field ground crews and the Panther Helicopters, the Third game went on as planned, and the Zephyrs won 2–1, Sending them to the Pacific coast League Championship series. This was the first tropical system the Zephyrs had to reschedule or cancel games with that season, As the 5th and Deciding game of the Pacific coast league title series was moved into the Afternoon due to  Hurricane Georges.

Texas
Three tornadoes touched down across the Lone Star State, at Caney Creek, La Porte, and Galveston. A major disaster declaration was issued for Brazoria, Galveston, and Harris counties.

Severe flooding was also reported in Harris County and Houston. More than 1,400 homes and businesses in and around Houston were either damaged or destroyed by the floods. In addition, three main highways in Houston were washed out, leaving many motorists stranded.

Roads and bridges were submerged near Corpus Christi. Flooding was also reported along the San Bernard River where several roads and a subdivision was flooded. The flooding also disrupted barge traffic at the Phillips Petroleum facility.

Coastal flooding occurred well in advance of the cyclone's landfall. Meacom's pier and San Luis Pass pier were severely damaged. Coastal flooding worsened backwater flooding in area rivers since their waters were blocked from flowing southeast into the Gulf of Mexico. Sabine Pass was cut off from the mainland for a week, until Hermine's passage to the east eased coastal flooding conditions.

See also

 Other storms of the same name
 List of wettest tropical cyclones in the United States
 Tropical Storm Hermine (2010)
 Tropical Storm Beta (2020)

References

External links

 HPC rainfall page for Frances

Frances
Frances 1998
Frances 1998
Frances 1998
Frances 1998
1998 natural disasters in the United States
1998 in Louisiana
1998 in Oklahoma
1998 in Texas
Houston hurricanes